Ccarhuarazo (possibly from Quechua, qarwa leaf worm; larva of a beetle; pale, yellowish, golden, Ancash Quechua rasu snow, ice, mountain with snow,  Hispanicized spellings Carhuaraso, Carhuarasu, Carhuarazo, Ccarhuaraso, Ccarhuarasu, Ccarhuarazo, Qarwarazo) is a volcano in the Andes of Peru, about 5,112 m (16,772 ft) high. It is located in the Ayacucho Region, Lucanas Province, Chipao District as well as in the Sucre Province, Soras District.

References

Volcanoes of Peru
Landforms of Ayacucho Region
Mountains of Peru
Mountains of Ayacucho Region